This is a list of electoral district results for the 1978 New South Wales state election.

Results by Electoral district

Albury

Armidale

Ashfield

Auburn

Balmain

Bankstown

Barwon

Bass Hill

Bathurst

Blacktown

Bligh

Blue Mountains

Broken Hill

Burrendong

Burrinjuck

Burwood

Byron

Campbelltown

Canterbury

Casino

Castlereagh

Cessnock

Charlestown

Clarence

Coogee

Corrimal

Cronulla

Davidson

Drummoyne

Dubbo

Earlwood 

Sir Eric Willis (Liberal) resigned on 16 June 1978 and Ken Gabb (Labor) won the resulting by-election, holding the seat at this election.

East Hills

Eastwood

Fairfield

Fuller

Georges River

Gloucester

Gordon

Gosford

Goulburn

Granville

Hawkesbury

Heathcote

Heffron

Hornsby

Hurstville

Illawarra

Kirribilli

Kogarah

Ku-ring-gai

Lake Macquarie

Lakemba

Lane Cove

Lismore

Liverpool

Maitland

Manly

Maroubra

Marrickville

Merrylands

Miranda

Monaro

Mosman

Mount Druitt

Munmorah

Murray

Murrumbidgee

Nepean

Newcastle

Northcott

Orange

Oxley

Parramatta

Peats

Penrith

Phillip

Pittwater

Raleigh

Rockdale

South Coast

Sturt

Tamworth

Temora

Tenterfield

The Hills

Upper Hunter

Vaucluse

Wagga Wagga

Wakehurst

Wallsend

Waratah

Waverley

Wentworthville

Willoughby 

The sitting member for Willoughby, Laurie McGinty (Liberal), lost preselection and contested the election as an Independent.

Wollondilly

Wollongong

Woronora

Yaralla

Young

See also 
 Candidates of the 1978 New South Wales state election
 Members of the New South Wales Legislative Assembly, 1978–1981

Notes

References

Bibliography

1978 Legislative Assembly